James Atuti (born 19 March 1954) is a Kenyan sprinter. He competed in the men's 400 metres at the 1984 Summer Olympics.

References

External links
 

1954 births
Living people
Athletes (track and field) at the 1984 Summer Olympics
Kenyan male sprinters
Olympic athletes of Kenya
Place of birth missing (living people)
20th-century Kenyan people